is a Japanese footballer who plays for Fukushima United FC.

Club statistics
Updated to 23 February 2018.

References

External links

Profile at Fukushima United FC

1988 births
Living people
Teikyo University alumni
Association football people from Tokyo
Japanese footballers
J3 League players
Japan Football League players
Fukushima United FC players
Association football defenders